Lee Colson McGriff (born October 3, 1953) is an American former college and professional football player who was a wide receiver in the National Football League (NFL) for a single season in 1976.  McGriff played college football for the Florida Gators football team of the University of Florida.  Thereafter, he played professionally for the Tampa Bay Buccaneers in their inaugural season in 1976.

Early years 

He was born in Tampa, Florida, and attended Henry B. Plant High School in Tampa.  He was a standout wide receiver for the Plant Panthers high school football team.

College career 

McGriff was raised in a family with a University of Florida sports tradition, but he was not offered an athletic scholarship to attend the university.   Instead, he elected to walk on to coach Doug Dickey's Florida Gators football team, and played for the Gators from 1972 to 1974.  He earned a place in the starting line-up and led the Gators in receiving in 1973 and 1974; McGriff averaged 18.5 yards on 38 catches with five touchdowns as a junior, and 19.4 yards on an SEC-leading 36 receptions with seven touchdowns as a senior team captain.  He finished his three-year college career with 87 receptions for 1,551 yards and 13 touchdowns.  Following his senior season, he was a first-team All-Southeastern Conference (SEC) selection and an honorable mention All-American, and was the recipient of the Gators' Fergie Ferguson Award.  He graduated from the university with a bachelor's degree in journalism in 1976, and was later inducted into the University of Florida Athletic Hall of Fame.

Professional career 

McGriff signed as an undrafted free agent with the expansion Tampa Bay Buccaneers in 1976.  He appeared in six games for the Buccaneers, and started three of them.

Life after playing career 

McGriff later served as an assistant coach for the Florida Gators, and became a partner in a successful Gainesville-based insurance agency.  He has served as the color analyst for Gators football games on the Gator Sports Radio Network since 2004.

McGriff's son, Travis McGriff, played for the Florida Gators from 1995 to 1998.

See also 

 Florida Gators football, 1970–79
 History of the Tampa Bay Buccaneers
 List of Florida Gators in the NFL Draft
 List of Tampa Bay Buccaneers players
 List of University of Florida alumni
 List of University of Florida Athletic Hall of Fame members

References

Bibliography 

  2013 Florida Football Media Guide, University Athletic Association, Gainesville, Florida (2013).
 Carlson, Norm, University of Florida Football Vault: The History of the Florida Gators, Whitman Publishing, LLC, Atlanta, Georgia (2007).  .
 Golenbock, Peter, Go Gators!  An Oral History of Florida's Pursuit of Gridiron Glory, Legends Publishing, LLC, St. Petersburg, Florida (2002).  .
 Hairston, Jack, Tales from the Gator Swamp: A Collection of the Greatest Gator Stories Ever Told, Sports Publishing, LLC, Champaign, Illinois (2002).  .
 McCarthy, Kevin M.,  Fightin' Gators: A History of University of Florida Football, Arcadia Publishing, Mount Pleasant, South Carolina (2000).  .
 McEwen, Tom, The Gators: A Story of Florida Football, The Strode Publishers, Huntsville, Alabama (1974).  .
 Nash, Noel, ed., The Gainesville Sun Presents The Greatest Moments in Florida Gators Football, Sports Publishing, Inc., Champaign, Illinois (1998).  .
 Proctor, Samuel, & Wright Langley, Gator History: A Pictorial History of the University of Florida, South Star Publishing Company, Gainesville, Florida (1986).  .

External links 
 Broadcasters – Gator Radio Network broadcaster profiles

1953 births
Living people
Players of American football from Tampa, Florida
American football wide receivers
Florida Gators football players
Tampa Bay Buccaneers players
Coaches of American football from Florida
Tampa Bay Buccaneers personnel
Florida Gators football coaches
Florida Gators football announcers
Henry B. Plant High School alumni